Nistorești is a commune located in Vrancea County, Romania. It is composed of nine villages: Bâtcari, Brădetu, Făgetu, Nistorești, Podu Șchiopului, Românești, Ungureni, Valea Neagră and Vetrești-Herăstrău.

References

Communes in Vrancea County
Localities in Western Moldavia